The 1938 Saskatchewan general election was held on June 8, 1938, to elect members of the Legislative Assembly of Saskatchewan.

The Liberal Party was returned to power under its new leader, William John Patterson, but it lost twelve of the seats it had held in the previous legislature. The Liberals faced several new forces in this election.

The Co-operative Commonwealth Federation, a democratic socialist party led by George Hara Williams, became the official opposition winning over 18% of the vote and ten seats in its first election. The party previously had five seats after the Farmer-Labour Group became the Saskatchewan CCF following the previous election.

The Social Credit Party of Saskatchewan, which promoted the social credit theories of monetary reform, rode a wave of popularity from the 1935 electoral success of its Alberta counterpart and collected almost 16% of the votes, but won only two seats.

Six "Unity" candidates also ran in an attempt to create a popular front of the Communists, CCF supporters and various populists. Although two were elected, they received only a very small fraction of the overall vote.

The Conservative Party – under its new leader, John Diefenbaker – continued its decline as their share of the popular vote fell from 25% to under 12%. The party won no seats. Diefenbaker later had considerably more success in the federal Conservative Party, eventually becoming leader and sweeping the party to power in the 1958 election with a huge majority.

Results

|- bgcolor=CCCCCC
!rowspan=2 colspan=2 align=center|Party
!rowspan=2 align=center|Party leader
!rowspan=2|Candidates
!colspan=4 align=center|Seats
!colspan=3 align=center|Popular vote
|- bgcolor=CCCCCC
|align="center"|1934
|align="center"|Dissol.
|align="center"|Elected
|align="center"|% Change
|align="center"|#
|align="center"|%
|align="center"|% Change

|align="center"|William Patterson
|align="right"| 53
|align="right"|50
|align="right"|50
|align="right"| 38
|align="right"|-24%
|align="right"|200,334
|align="right"|45.45%
|align="right"|-2.55%

|align="center"|George Williams
|align="right"| 31
|align="right"|5
|align="right"|5
|align="right"| 10
|align="right"|+100%
|align="right"|82,529
|align="right"|18.73%
|align="right"|-5.26%

|align="center"|Joseph Needham(default)
|align="right"| 40
|align="right"|*
|align="right"|–
|align="right"| 2
|align="right"|*
|align="right"|70,084
|align="right"|15.90%
|align="right"|*

|align=left|Unity
|align="center"|
|align="right"| 3
|align="right"|–
|align="right"|–
|align="right"| 2
|align="right"|–
|align="right"|9,848
|align="right"|2.24%
|align="right"|+2.00%

|align=left|Conservative
|align="center"|John Diefenbaker
|align="right"| 24
|align="right"|–
|align="right"|–
|align="right"| –
|align="right"|–
|align="right"|52,315
|align="right"|11.87%
|align="right"|-14.88%

| colspan=2 align=left|Independent Labour
|align="right"| 3
|align="right"|*
|align="right"|–
|align="right"| –
|align="right"|*
|align="right"|12,039
|align="right"|2.73%
|align="right"|+2.40%

|align=left|Labour Progressive
|align="center"|
|align="right"| 2
|align="right"|*
|align="right"|–
|align="right"| –
|align="right"|*
|align="right"|8,514
|align="right"|1.93%
|align="right"|*

| colspan=2 align=left|Independent
|align="right"| 2
|align="right"|–
|align="right"|–
|align="right"| –
|align="right"|–
|align="right"|4,023
|align="right"|0.91%
|align="right"|+0.22%

| colspan=2 align=left|Independent Conservative
|align="right"| 1
|align="right"|*
|align="right"|–
|align="right"| –
|align="right"|*
|align="right"|828
|align="right"|0.19%
|align="right"|*
|-
| bgcolor="ACDEAD"|
| colspan=2 align=left|Independent Social Credit
|align="right"| 1
|align="right"|*
|align="right"|–
|align="right"| –
|align="right"|*
|align="right"|228
|align="right"|0.05%
|align="right"|*
|-
|colspan=3| Total
|align="right"| 160
|align="right"|55
|align="right"|55
|align="right"| 52
|align="right"|-5.5%
|align="right"|440,742
|align="right"|100%
|align="right"| 
|-
| align="center" colspan=11|Source: Elections Saskatchewan
|-

Note: * Party did not nominate candidates in previous election.

Percentages

Ranking

Riding results
Names in bold represent cabinet ministers and the Speaker. Party leaders are italicized. The symbol " ** " indicates MLAs who are not running again.

Northwestern Saskatchewan

|style="width: 130px"|Liberal
|Paul Prince
|align="right"|3,289
|align="right"|61.76%
|align="right"|+13.71%

|CCF
|Max Campbell
|align="right"|2,036
|align="right"|38.24%
|align="right"|+18.41%
|- bgcolor="white"
!align="left" colspan=3|Total
!align="right"|5,325
!align="right"|100.00%
!align="right"|

|style="width: 130px"|Liberal
|Hubert Staines
|align="right"|Acclaimed
|align="right"|100.00%
|- bgcolor="white"
!align="left" colspan=3|Total
!align="right"|Acclamation
!align="right"|

Northeastern Saskatchewan

|-

|style="width: 130px"|CCF
|Joe Burton
|align="right"|3,909
|align="right"|50.90%
|align="right"|+4.75%

|Liberal
|Charles Dunn
|align="right"|3,771
|align="right"|49.10%
|align="right"|+0.41%
|- bgcolor="white"
!align="left" colspan=3|Total
!align="right"|7,680
!align="right"|100.00%
!align="right"|

|style="width: 130px"|Liberal
|Harry Fraser
|align="right"|Acclaimed
|align="right"|100.00%
|- bgcolor="white"
!align="left" colspan=3|Total
!align="right"|Acclamation
!align="right"|

West Central Saskatchewan

East Central Saskatchewan

Southwest Saskatchewan

Southeast Saskatchewan

Urban constituencies

| style="width: 130px"|Liberal
|Bernard J. McDaniel (elected)
|align="right"|10,197
|align="right"|49.52%
|align="right"|–

|Conservative
|Reginald M. Balfour
|align="right"|5,809
|align="right"|28.21%
|align="right"|–

|CCF
|Charles Cromwell Williams
|align="right"|4,298
|align="right"|20.87%
|align="right"|–

|Social Credit –Farmer-Labour
|J.B. McLeod
|align="right"|156
|align="right"|0.76%
|align="right"|–

|Social Credit
|Cornelius Rink
|align="right"|133
|align="right"|0.64%
|align="right"|–
|- bgcolor="white"
!align="left" colspan=3|Total
!align="right"|20,593
!align="right"|100.00%
!align="right"|

See also
List of Saskatchewan political parties
List of Saskatchewan provincial electoral districts

Notes

References
Brown, Lorne A. "The Early CCF in Saskatchewan." In The Prairie Agrarian Movement Revisited, edited by Murray Knuttila and Bob Stirling, 169-185. Regina: Canadian Plains Research Center, 2007.
Saskatchewan Archives Board - Election Results By Electoral Division
Elections Saskatchewan - Provincial Vote Summaries

Further reading
 

1938 elections in Canada
1938 in Saskatchewan
1938
June 1938 events